Ebrachosaurus is an extinct genus of aetosaur. It was named after the town of Ebrach, Germany, near an outcrop of the Blasensandstein Formation where the original fossils have been found. Other Blasensandstein fauna include the temnospondyl Metoposaurus and the phytosaur Francosuchus. The genus has often been considered synonymous with the closely related Stagonolepis. The holotype specimen was lost during World War II, so its relationships within Stagonolepididae remain indeterminant.

References

External links
Ebrachosaurus in the Paleobiology Database

Aetosaurs
Late Triassic reptiles of Europe
Late Triassic pseudosuchians
Fossil taxa described in 1936
Taxa named by Oskar Kuhn
Prehistoric pseudosuchian genera